Emmanuel Romary (born 12 October 1968 in Luxeuil-les-Bains) is a retired French athlete who specialised in the sprint hurdles. He represented his country at the 1996 Summer Olympics and 1995 World Championships.

His personal bests are 13.52 seconds in the 110 metres hurdles (+1.9 m/s, Évry-Bondoufle 1996) and 7.77 seconds in the 60 metres hurdles (Paris 1996).

International competitions

References

Living people
1968 births
French male hurdlers
Olympic athletes of France
Athletes (track and field) at the 1996 Summer Olympics
World Athletics Championships athletes for France
People from Luxeuil-les-Bains
Sportspeople from Haute-Saône
20th-century French people
21st-century French people